Puerto Rico Highway 139 (PR-139) is a two-way secondary  highway in the municipality of Ponce, Puerto Rico.

Route description
The road runs north to south, and mostly alongside Río Cerrillos in barrio Maragüez, borders the edge of Lake Cerrillos, and then runs through barrio Cerrillos and from there into the city of Ponce.

Communities served
As the road is traveled in a northbound fashion, it serves barrios Machuelo Arriba, Maragüez, and Anón.

Major intersections

Related routes

Puerto Rico Highway 139R

Puerto Rico Highway 139R (abbreviated Ramal PR-139 or PR-139R) is a spur route or ramal from its parent route PR-139, and the main (and only) access to Cerrillos Dam and Luis A. "Wito" Morales Park.

Puerto Rico Highway 5139

Puerto Rico Highway 5139 (PR-5139) is a north–south connector located between PR-14 and PR-139. This road runs through Cerrillos and Machuelo Arriba barrios, crossing Cerrillos River near Cerrillos Dam.

See also

 List of highways in Ponce, Puerto Rico
 List of highways numbered 139

References

External links

 Info on PR-139, km 23.4 Bridge "La Carmelita"
 PR-5139, Machuelo Arriba

139
Roads in Ponce, Puerto Rico